Brown Candover is a village in Hampshire, England.

Governance
The village of Brown Candover is part of the civil parish of Candovers, and is part of the Upton Grey and the Candovers ward of Basingstoke and Deane borough council. The borough council is a Non-metropolitan district of Hampshire County Council.

See also
 Chilton Candover
 Preston Candover

References

External links

Villages in Hampshire